Hollyoaks is a British television soap opera that was first broadcast on 23 October 1995. The following is a list of characters introduced in 2020, by order of first appearance. All characters were introduced by executive producer, Bryan Kirkwood. January saw the introduction of Tony Hutchinson's (Nick Pickard) sister Verity (Eva O'Hara) and PC George Kiss (Callum Kerr). March saw the arrival of Mitchell Deveraux (Imran Adams), Toby Faroe (Bobby Gordon) and Celeste Faroe's (Andrea Ali) father, Felix Westwood (Richard Blackwood). Kyle Kelly's (Adam Rickitt) parents, Mark (Christopher Quinten) and Carole (Diana Weston) first appeared in May, while Sylver McQueen's (David Tag) secret daughter, Cher Winters (Bethannie Hare) and Jordan Price's (Connor Calland) drugs boss, Victor Brothers (Benjamin O'Mahoney) made their debuts in June. July saw the arrival of Cormac Ranger (James Gaddas) and Ripley Lennox (Ki Griffin). Summer Ranger (Rhiannon Clements) then made her first appearance in November. Additionally, multiple other characters appear throughout the year.

Verity Hutchinson

Verity Hutchinson, played by Eva O'Hara, made her first appearance on 6 January 2020, as part of Hollyoaks Later and her last appearance on 7 December 2022 when she dies following a cardiac arrest after having a bookshelf pushed on top of her by Bobby Costello. The character was announced on 20 September 2019, but casting wasn't revealed until 10 December 2019. Verity is the sister of the soap's longest-running character Tony Hutchinson (Nick Pickard) and the daughter of Edward Hutchinson (Joe McGann). Verity is Edward's favourite child and arrives in the village to launch her own law firm. Describing the character, Eva said that she "can hold her own in any situation and really doesn't take no for an answer", adding: "She has a fascinating balance of ruthlessness and compassion, making her one to watch... I've found myself feeling jealous of her fearlessness at times."

Speaking about her casting, she said: "I have been totally bowled over by the wonderful team at Hollyoaks. I have fallen in love with the warmth and passion of everyone involved, and feel utterly blessed to be involved in such a creative environment."

George Kiss

George Kiss, played by Callum Kerr, made his first appearance on 30 January 2020. The character and casting was announced on 20 January 2020. George is involved in a county lines drug trafficking storyline, and made his first appearance after Nancy Osborne (Jessica Fox) is stabbed at Hollyoaks High.

Speaking about being part of the show, Kerr said: "I feel very honoured to be joining the cast of Hollyoaks during such a thrilling time for the show. My first couple of months have been brilliant and the cast and crew are very friendly and welcoming. My grandfather was a policeman like my character, so he'll be delighted to see me in the uniform. I'll be part of the team investigating the County Lines storyline, which will hopefully help raise awareness of a relevant topic and shed light on a serious issue." Speaking further about the character's personality, Kerr said: "He'd be willing to risk his life, as long as the papers wrote about him afterwards and called him a 'hero cop'! I think he'd do anything. George is going to put himself in some dangerous situations when he should probably wait for back-up. But I think he loves the action and he is so passionate that he rushes in without thinking. George is very exciting as a new character. He's passionate and he loves his job. He loves being the saviour and being in the limelight. George loves the action of being a policeman, more so than the paperwork and the logistics. You'll see that he's quite flirty, he's very friendly with everyone and he has got a really exciting storyline."

He continued, saying: "My first scenes come when Nancy has just been stabbed in the playground after an altercation and the police are called. George is the first officer on the scene, but the paramedics are already there. He has to try to understand what's going on very quickly. George takes control of the situation immediately. It's a really nice way to be introduced, showing him as someone who's trustworthy and who can take control of a dangerous situation. I think there'll be a lot of those, over the course of the next year. So far my scenes have been with the teachers at the school. I have shared scenes with Nancy, Sally, John Paul, and then a few of the worried parents as well. I've also been with DS Cohen a few times. She's my boss and she's very good at her job, so George is keen to impress! You'll see that George is a police officer for the right reasons and his heart is in it. He wants to make sure this village, and the kids in it, are safe from the dangers that come from drug dealing and drug trafficking.""

Following his first appearance, George quickly became a love interest for John Paul McQueen (James Sutton). Much of their relationship took place off-screen, as the impact of the COVID-19 pandemic on television meant that four months of filming was lost, and Kerr said that their "relationship blossoming and the good parts of their relationship" were not seen. He felt that it was a shame that viewers were not able to see the scenes, but said that the writers did a good job with what they could do. The relationship becomes abusive, with George having coercive control over John Paul. His "sick manipulation" includes using his ex-boyfriend Dean Vickers (Paul Sloss), who he also abused, to make John Paul jealous, hitting John Paul, and isolating him from his family and friends. In a surprise scene broadcast on 22 April 2021, George is murdered. Digital Spy had to confirm that George had really died, as earlier that week, the character faked his own death as part of his abusive relationship with John Paul. Kerr was grateful to be on the show, stating that while he would have liked to appear for longer, he was happy that his tenure was not shorter. He also felt that his tenure was long enough to do the abuse storyline justice, noting that some viewers were calling for the storyline to end. Kerr spoke with the producers about the fate of his character and they agreed that his death was a "justifiable end" for his character. Both Kerr and the producers opined that George returning in the future "to cause more havoc" would not be a good arc for the soap, since they felt his abuse was "disgusting". They also wanted John Paul to be able to move on from the trauma of the relationship properly. The suspects for George's murder include John Paul, Nancy, Dean, Mercedes McQueen (Jennifer Metcalfe), Theresa McQueen (Jorgie Porter), Cher Winters (Bethannie Hare), Sally St. Claire (Annie Wallace), James Nightingale (Gregory Finnegan), and Ste Hay (Kieron Richardson). Kerr confirmed that he knew the murderer and stated that it will not be revealed "for a while". It is later revealed through a series of flashback scenes that Sally is responsible for his death when she finds him about to attack Theresa.

Felix Westwood

Felix Westwood, played by Richard Blackwood, made his first appearance on 30 March 2020. The character was announced on 24 January 2020, while speculation about Blackwood being cast on the show started on 23 January 2020 after he was spotted on set. Felix is a past love interest of Martine Deveraux (Kéllé Bryan), and is the father of Mitchell Deveraux (Imran Adams), Toby Faroe (Bobby Gordon) and Celeste Faroe (Andrea Ali). On 3 February 2020 co-star Jamie Lomas who plays Warren Fox announced the character Felix is a face from Warren's past.

On his casting, Blackwood said: "I feel amazed and honoured to join the cast of Hollyoaks. After finishing at EastEnders, I did a few plays and a TV show for America. Now, I feel ready with what I've learnt in my hiatus to be a part of this show. I plan to take my acting to the next level and this character will help tremendously with that growth!" Blackwood's casting was also praised by Adams, who said: "He's such a charming, personable, hardworking guy and I feel like, because of those attributes, he will be a perfect fit in the Deveraux clan who are loved by so many Hollyoaks fans. It's great to see such an iconic show have such diversity, and I know that Hollyoaks will continue to be the leader with that topic and I'm grateful to have him on board." Adams later added that Felix would be a bit of a bad boy, saying: "He is going to be a bad boy. But I think he's going to be one of the bad boys who goes down in the Hollyoaks history books. He will definitely shake things up and I can't wait to work with him, to be honest."

Appearing on Good Morning Britain before his character's debut, Blackwood explained his character's past, saying that Felix is quite a "dark character." He added: "You'll find through the story there's things that have happened that conditioned him to be the way that he is. He's a bit desensitised from emotion in that sense. When he interacts with people, you can see that. You've got to play the truth of why they became that way. What Hollyoaks has done, which I think is beautiful, is they've gone into the history of why he has become that way."

Felix first arrives in the village after he receives a call from Celeste who pretends to be her long-lost mother, Felix's ex-girlfriend, Martine. He arrives in the village in a BMW and flirts with Grace Black (Tamara Wall) and Diane Hutchinson (Alex Fletcher) after splashing Grace and ruining her expensive hells. He offers Sienna Blake (Anna Passey) help as she is struggling to get out a taxt, but she refuses. He arrives at the Deverauxes' front door where his son, Mitchell, and his boyfriend Scott Drinkwell (Ross Adams) are having an argument with his other son Toby, Celeste, Martine, their grandfather Walter Deveraux (Trevor A. Toussaint) and their cousin Lisa Loveday (Rachel Adedeji).

Mark Kelly
Mark Kelly, played by Christopher Quinten, made his first appearance on 14 April 2020. The character and casting was announced on 11 February 2020. Mark is the father of established character Kyle Kelly (Adam Rickitt), and the husband of fellow newcomer, Carole Kelly (Diana Weston). On Coronation Street, Quinten had played the role of Brian Tilsley, the father of Rickitt's then character, Nick Tilsley, although the pair never met during the others run on the soap.

In a statement about the characters, Rickitt said: "This is one of the more surreal experiences of my career. After 23 years, I finally get to meet my first onscreen dad, which is truly bizarre. It's an honour to have such well-established actors like Chris and Diana come in to play my parents and I've really enjoyed the scenes we've filmed so far. Plus at least having parents in the show means Kyle has an excuse to regress into adolescence, which comes quite easily to him."

Speaking about joining the show, Quinten said: "I've thoroughly enjoyed the scenes I've filmed so far at Hollyoaks, I already love the show and all of the cast, crew and production staff are fantastic and so friendly. Working with Adam after first playing 'his' dad more than thirty years ago is a dream come true, it's a brilliant piece of soap nostalgia, which I hope everyone enjoys."

Carole Kelly
Carole Kelly, played by Diana Weston, made her first appearance on 14 April 2020. The character and casting was announced on 11 February 2020. Carole is the mother of established character Kyle Kelly (Adam Rickitt), and the wife of fellow newcomer Mark Kelly (Christopher Quinten).

Cher Winters

Cher Winters, played by Bethannie Hare, made her first appearance on 1 June 2020. The character and casting was announced on 12 April 2020. Cher is the daughter of established character Sylver McQueen (David Tag), although before her arrival, he is unaware of her existence. Cher arrives to the village, searching for her father, Sylver, and watches him, Mercedes McQueen (Jennifer Metcalfe) and Warren Fox (Jamie Lomas) from afar. She attends Sylver and Mercedes' vow renewal ceremony, assuming Warren is Sylver, where she privately tells him that she's his daughter. Warren informs her that he was in prison when she was conceived, insisting he is not her father. When Goldie McQueen (Chelsee Healey) offers her a place to stay, she privately approaches Sylver, asking for £3,000 and then she will leave. Sylver agrees to get her the money, but she declines it as she wants to have the opportunity to get to know him better. Cher's mother, Kelly Winters (Jenny Wickham), arrives and informs her that she and her other children are moving to Greece without Cher. When the McQueen family are blackmailed into revealing the family's secrets, Cher discovers that Sylver murdered Breda McQueen (Moya Brady). In return, she reveals that she accidentally murdered her half-sister Liza, due to being jealous of how much attention Kelly gave to her.

Victor Brothers

Victor Brothers, played by Benjamin O'Mahony, made his first appearance on 16 June 2020. The character and casting was announced on 7 April 2020. Victor is the boss of drugdealer Jordan Price (Connor Calland), and is said to be the man behind the County Line drug operation. Calland teased that Victor's arrival will mean that Jordan is "not the nastiest person in the village anymore."

Victor has been described as enigmatic and "complex" with O'Mahoney saying of his character: "Victor is (arguably) a sociopath, who is willing to do whatever it takes to get what he wants – comfortable with manipulating and exploiting vulnerable children to build himself the empire he thinks he deserves. I would argue that Victor sees himself as an efficient businessman working within a violent industry, but there is also another side to him that is addicted to the power and loves to see the fear in people's eyes."

Ripley Lennox

Ripley Lennox, played by Ki Griffin, made their first appearance on 20 July 2020. Ripley is a stall-owner at the Cunningham's Grand Bazaar, and in their first appearance they attempt to help Yasmine Maalik (Haiesha Mistry) out of Tom Cunningham (Ellis Hollins) buying her a jumper she doesn't like by lying about the price. However, Tom still buys the item at the inflated price. No announcement was made of Ripley's casting, but it was announced on 9 August of that year that they were part of the regular cast. Alongside Tom and Yasmine, it was confirmed that Ripley would strike up friendships with Peri Lomax (Ruby O'Donnell) and Romeo Quinn (Owen Warner). Actor Griffin was featured in a video on Hollyoaks social media in February 2021, in which they explained Ripley is non-binary and they would come out to their friends in upcoming scenes; the scenes were scheduled for February to coincide with LGBT History Month. Griffin stated Ripley being non-binary is "wonderful," since it provides representation to a previously unrepresented group of people. Griffin added it was "beautiful" a non-binary actor was portraying the role.

Summer Ranger

Summer Ranger, played by Rhiannon Clements, made her first appearance on 23 November 2020. The character and casting was announced on 19 October 2020. Summer is the daughter of Cormac Ranger (James Gaddas), and arrives in the village after he falls into a coma on account of being assaulted by Warren Fox (Jamie Lomas). After arriving in the village, Summer will set up a baking business in the Grande Bazaar. A Hollyoaks spokesperson said that Summer was "angelic on the outside, but a mischievous minx on the inside." They added that Summer was also "a bright, effortlessly cool tomboy, but when she wants something, she's capable of going to extreme lengths to get it," and teased that she would be a "frenemy" to Sienna in both her life and love. On her casting and character, Clements said: "I was absolutely buzzing and really grateful in our current climate to get the opportunity to join the Hollyoaks family. Summer is fun, sarcastic and I love the zest she brings. She's all sweetness and light but she also has a nasty bite, which is going to be brilliant to play. Once Summer sets her mind on something, be it an idea, a plan or a person, she will do everything she can to make things go her way. Also, I'm incredibly jealous of her wardrobe!"

Other characters

References

, Hollyoaks
2020
Hollyoaks